Laverne Smith (born September 12, 1954) is a former American football running back who played for the Pittsburgh Steelers of the National Football League. He was drafted by the Pittsburgh Steelers in the fourth round of the 1977 NFL Draft. He played college football at the University of Kansas and attended Wichita Southeast High School in Wichita, Kansas.

Early years
Smith played high school football for the Wichita Southeast High School Golden Buffaloes, earning first-team All-City honors in 1971 and 1972. He also participated in track and field for the Golden Buffaloes, winning the state championship in the 100-yard dash in 1971. He was inducted into the Southeast High School Sports Hall of Fame in 2012.

College career
Smith played for the Kansas Jayhawks from 1973 to 1976 and was a three-year starter. He garnered All-Big Eight recognition in 1974. He set school records for career rushing yards with 3,192 and single season rushing yards with 1,181 in 1974. Smith also accumulated career totals of 23 rushing touchdowns on 488 attempts, and averaged a stunning 6.5 yards per carry (also a school record). He recorded 217 yards and two touchdowns on 21 receptions. He also participated in track for the Jayhawks, winning the 1976 Big Eight championship in the 100 meters and 440-yard relay. His personal bests were 10.29 for the 100 meters, and 20.44 for the 200 meter dash.

Professional career

Pittsburgh Steelers
Smith was selected by the Pittsburgh Steelers with the 99th pick in the 1977 NFL Draft. He played in seven games for the team, and later suffered a broken leg, during the 1977 season. He spent a few more years on the Steelers roster.

Personal life
Smith later Retired at Boeing Wichita.

References

External links
Just Sports Stats
College stats

Living people
1954 births
Players of American football from Mississippi
American football running backs
African-American players of American football
Kansas Jayhawks football players
African-American male track and field athletes
College men's track and field athletes in the United States
Pittsburgh Steelers players
People from Greenwood, Mississippi
Wichita Southeast High School alumni
21st-century African-American people
20th-century African-American sportspeople